Juan Alonso Pérez de Guzmán y Coronel (1285-1351), second lord of Sanlúcar, was a Castilian noble of the house of Medina Sidonia. 
He was the son of Alonso Pérez de Guzmán and María Alfonso Coronel. 
He defeated the troops of the King of Portugal in the Battle of Villanueva de Barcarrota (1336).  He died in 1351.

Family

From his first marriage to Beatriz Ponce de León y Meneses, great granddaughter of King Alfonso IX of León and daughter of Fernán Pérez Ponce de León I, commander of the frontier of Andalusia and lord of Puebla de Asturias, three children were born:
Alonso de Guzman (died December 1330 ). He died at nine years of age, as a result of being butted by a deer, and was buried in the monastery of San Isidoro del Campo.
Alonso Pérez de Guzmán y Ponce de León, third Lord of Sanlúcar.
María de Guzmán, died childless.
He remarried in 1334 to Urraca Osorio (died 1367), daughter of Álvar Núñez Osorio and Mayor Perez, who had:
 Juan Alonso Pérez de Guzmán y Osorio, fourth lord of Sanlúcar and first Count of Niebla.

References

Sources

Further reading 
 
 
 
 
 
 
 

1285 births
1351 deaths
13th-century Castilian nobility
14th-century Castilian nobility
People from Ceuta